Günther Schütt (31 March 1918 – 19 March 1996) was a German rower. He competed in the men's single sculls event at the 1952 Summer Olympics, representing Saar.

References

1918 births
1996 deaths
German male rowers
Olympic rowers of Saar
Rowers at the 1952 Summer Olympics
Rowers from Berlin
20th-century German people